Bistorta is a genus of flowering plants in the family Polygonaceae.  about 40 species are accepted. It has been supported as a separate clade by molecular phylogenetic analysis. Bistorta species are native throughout much of the Northern Hemisphere, as far south as Mexico in North America and Thailand in Asia.

Description
Species of Bistorta are perennial herbaceous plants. Their roots are fibrous, forming rhizomes. They have erect, unbranched stems. Their leaves are usually longer than wide, mostly basal, but with some arranged alternately on the stems. The inflorescences are spikelike. The individual flowers have five white to purple-pink (rarely red) tepals. The flowers are bisexual, although the 5–8 stamens are sometimes poorly developed. There are three styles. The fruits are in the form of achenes, that are brown or dark brown, unwinged, and three-angled. The monoploid number of chromosomes, x, is 11 or 12.

Taxonomy
In 1753, Carl Linnaeus divided up his genus Polygonum into unranked groups, one of which was Bistorta. In 1754, Giovanni Antonio Scopoli elevated Bistorta to a genus.

Bistorta is placed in the subfamily Polygonoideae, tribe Persicarieae, along with the genera Koenigia and Persicaria. A 2015 molecular phylogenetic study suggested that the tribes in Polygonoideae were related as shown in the following cladogram.

Within the tribe Persicarieae, Bistorta is most closely related to Koenigia:

Species 
, Plants of the World Online accepted the following 42 species.

Bistorta abukumensis Yonek., Iketsu & H.Ohashi
Bistorta affinis (D.Don) Greene
Bistorta albiflora Miyam. & H.Ohba
Bistorta alopecuroides (Turcz. ex Besser) Kom.
Bistorta amplexicaulis (D.Don) Greene
Bistorta attenuata Kom.
Bistorta attenuatifolia Miyam. & H.Ohba
Bistorta bistortoides (Pursh) Small
Bistorta burmanica Yonek. & H.Ohashi
Bistorta coriacea (Sam.) Yonek. & H.Ohashi
Bistorta diopetes H.Ohba & S.Akiyama
Bistorta elliptica (Willd. ex Spreng.) V.V.Petrovsky, D.F.Murray & Elven
Bistorta emodi (Meisn.) H.Hara
Bistorta griersonii Yonek. & H.Ohashi
Bistorta griffithii (Hook.f.) Grierson
Bistorta hayachinensis (Makino) H.Gross
Bistorta honanensis (H.W.Kung) Yonek. & H.Ohashi
Bistorta incana (Nakai) Nakai
Bistorta jaljalensis H.Ohba & S.Akiyama
Bistorta krascheninnikovii N.A.Ivanova
Bistorta longispicata Yonek. & H.Ohashi
Bistorta ludlowii Yonek. & H.Ohashi
Bistorta macrophylla (D.Don) Soják
Bistorta manshuriensis (Petrov ex Kom.) Kom.
Bistorta milletii H.Lév.
Bistorta milletioides H.Ohba & S.Akiyama
Bistorta ochotensis Kom.
Bistorta officinalis Delarbre
Bistorta paleacea (Wall. ex Hook.f.) Yonek. & H.Ohashi
Bistorta perpusilla (Hook.f.) Greene
Bistorta plumosa (Small) Greene
Bistorta purpureonervosa (A.J.Li) Yonek. & H.Ohashi
 (Brügger) Dostál
Bistorta rubra Yonek. & H.Ohashi
Bistorta sherei H.Ohba & S.Akiyama
Bistorta sinomontana (Sam.) Miyam.
Bistorta subscaposa (Diels) Petrov
Bistorta suffulta (Maxim.) Greene ex H.Gross
Bistorta tenuicaulis (Bisset & S.Moore) Nakai
Bistorta tenuifolia (H.W.Kung) Miyam. & H.Ohba
Bistorta tubistipulis Miyam. & H.Ohba
Bistorta vacciniifolia (Wall. ex Meisn.) Greene
Bistorta vivipara (L.) Delarbre

References 

 
Polygonaceae genera